The Sierra de la Laguna dry forests are a subtropical dry forest ecoregion of the southern Baja California Peninsula in Mexico.

Geography
The dry forests cover the lower elevations of the Sierra de la Laguna, from  elevation. They are surrounded at lower elevations by the San Lucan xeric scrub, which lies between sea level and  elevation. Above 800 meters elevation, the dry forests transition to the subhumid and temperate Sierra de la Laguna pine-oak forests.

Climate
The ecoregion has a warm and dry subtropical climate. Annual precipitation is generally less than 500 mm. The highest-rainfall months are late summer, from August to October with peak annual precipitation in September.

Flora
The characteristic vegetation is dry forest, composed of low trees and shrubs with an herbaceous understory. Many of the trees are deciduous, dropping their leaves during the dry season. The predominant tree species of the dry forests are the mauto (Lysiloma divaricatum), palo blanco (L. candidum), cajalosucho (Bursera microphylla) and palo zorrillo (Hesperalbizia occidentalis).

Herbaceous plants are less prominent and include caribe (Cnidoscolus angustidens), buena mujer (Chloracantha spinosa), Solanum spp., and biznaga (Ferocactus spp).

The endemic palm here is Brahea brandegeei, that occurs in washes and along streams.

Fauna
Bats in the ecoregion include the peninsular myotis (Myotis peninsularis), found only in the southern Baja Peninsula, and the Mexican long-tongued bat (Choeronycteris mexicana) and lesser long-nosed bat (Leptonycteris yerbabuenae), which are important pollinators for some desert plants.

Other native animals include the peninsular mule deer (Odocoileus hemionus peninsulae), white-tailed antelope squirrel (Ammospermophilus leucurus), acorn woodpecker (Melanerpes formicivorus), red-spotted toad (Anaxyrus punctatus), and Baja California chorus frog (Pseudacris hypochondriaca).

Dalquest's pocket mouse (Chaetodipus dalquesti), the Baja California slider (Trachemys nebulosa), and the Cape arboreal spiny lizard (Sceloporus licki) are restricted to the southern Baja California Peninsula. The San Lucan gecko (Phyllodactylus unctus) is restricted to the southern peninsula and adjacent islands in the gulf.

Protected areas
A 2017 assessment found that 839 km², or 21%, of the ecoregion is in protected areas. Protected areas in the ecoregion include the Sierra de la Laguna Biosphere Reserve.

See also
 List of ecoregions in Mexico
 
 Tropical and subtropical dry broadleaf forests

External links

 
Tropical Dry Forest of the Sierra de la Laguna (Los Cabos Guide)

References

Ecoregions of Mexico
Forests of Mexico
Natural history of Baja California Sur
La Paz Municipality (Baja California Sur)
Los Cabos Municipality (Baja California Sur)

Neotropical dry broadleaf forests